Francisco Cantú is an American author, agent and translator. He served as agent of United States Border Patrol between 2008 and 2012.

Awards 

 Whiting Awards in Non-fiction in 2017
 Los Angeles Times Book Prize for Current Interest in 2018
 Finalist for National Book Critics Circle Award for Nonfiction in 2018

Bibliography

References 

American writers
Living people
The New Yorker people
United States Border Patrol agents
Year of birth missing (living people)